Holmer Green Senior School is a co-educational secondary school and sixth form with academy status, located in Holmer Green, Buckinghamshire, England. The school has approximately 860 pupils. The school shares a common catchment area with the nearby Sir William Ramsay School.

In September 2006 the school was designated by the Department for Education and Skills (DfES) as a specialist school in Business & Enterprise.

In 2008, the school was one of 34 UK secondary schools to win the NACE challenge award for its approach to able, gifted and talented children. In the same year, it also received an excellent Ofsted report which compared favourably to other secondary schools nearby.

In 2016 the school was inspected by Ofsted and awarded a 'good' rating with inspectors saying pupils were 'exceptionally well prepared for life in modern Britain'.

Notable former pupils
James Corden,  television host, actor, comedian, and singer.
Aaron Taylor-Johnson, actor

Phone masts 
Holmer Green Senior School is one of several Buckinghamshire schools which host mobile phone masts. Contracts between Buckinghamshire County Council and various mobile phone operators generate an income of £145,000 per annum, of which about £59,000 comes from contracts for masts that are installed in schools.

References

External links
Department for Education Performance Tables 2011

Secondary schools in Buckinghamshire
Academies in Buckinghamshire